The Mitsubishi Fuso Super Great (Japanese:三菱ふそう・スーパーグレート) is a heavy-duty commercial vehicle produced by Mitsubishi Fuso, a former division of Mitsubishi Motors (later acquired by Daimler AG). Launched in 1996 to succeed the Mitsubishi Fuso The Great. The range was primarily available in other big-size trucks.

Most big-size models of the truck are distinguishable using a front 'Super Great' badge, but the common badge is usually used on the rear.

The Super Great had driver's airbag and wheel parking brake equipped in 2000. The Super Great's cab was heavily facelifted, and the UD Trucks based AdBlue Urea Selective catalytic reduction system was equipped in 2007 on the facelift version, also used in the Nissan Diesel Quon.

In April 2017, the Super Great received another facelift. Standard equipment in the new Super Great include a new LED projector headlamps, a new 4-spoke steering wheel (replacing the original facelift version), an integrated new instrument cluster, an improved 12-speed automated manual transmission (now branded as SHIFTPILOT) and a multi-function key with push start/stop button. Sales commence of this new model in Japan started later in 2017. Safety features including Active Brake Assist, Active Attention Assistant that monitors driver alertness and provides a warning when a low attention level or distraction is detected, Lane Departure Warning System and Proximity Control Assist.

Models

Asia-Pacific, Mid-East, Africa, South America
FP (4x2)
FT (6x2 front twin-steer axle)
FR (4x4)
FU (6x2 rear tag axle)
FV (6x4)
FS (8x4)
FY (6x4 low-floor)
FW (6x6)
FX (8x8) - JGSDF only

Australia
Sold as Heavy
Prime Movers
FP54 AMT 4x2
FV54 AMT 6x4 (standard and high roof available)
FV
AMT 6x4 MWB (air and mechanical suspension available)
AMT 6x4 XLWB (air suspension)
FS
AMT 8x4 LWB
Auto 8x4 LWB

Engines

New Zealand
Fuso Shogun (truck model in New Zealand only)
Shogun 4x2 350
Shogun 6x4 350/430/HT 470/HT 530
Shogun 8x4 430

See also
Mitsubishi Fuso Truck & Bus Corporation

External links

Mitsubishi Fuso Super Great Japan
Mitsubishi Fuso Super Great Worldwide "FP/FV"
Fuso Australia Heavy
Mitsubishi Fuso Super Great New Zealand "Shogun"
Mitsubishi Fuso Super Great South Africa "FP/FV"

References

Super Great
Cab over vehicles